Phoenix Rising Soccer Complex at Wild Horse Pass  is a soccer complex including the Wild Horse Pass Stadium, a soccer-specific stadium near Chandler, Arizona. It is the former home of Phoenix Rising FC of the USL Championship. The stadium was completed before the start of the 2021 USL Championship season. The stadium was built on land in the Gila River Indian Community, near Interstate 10 and Loop 202. The complex has 10,000 seats with a video board, press box, improved sound, a family-friendly general admission section, ticket office, locker rooms, two practice fields, and a on-site administrative office.

Background

During planning for a permanent stadium, Phoenix Rising considered sites in Mesa, Phoenix, Salt River Pima-Maricopa Indian Community, Scottsdale and Tempe.

History
The first Phoenix Rising game at the complex was held on April 30, 2021, when Rising defeated San Diego Loyal SC 4–1. Jon Bakero scored the first goal on the 39th minute, followed by Santi Moar, Aodhan Quinn and Kevon Lambert. The last game Phoenix Rising at Wild Horse Pass was on October 15, 2022, with Rising coming out on top 3–1 over Atlanta United 2. The final goal was scored in the 80th minute by Jackson Conway for Atlanta.

References 

Sports venues completed in 2021
Soccer venues in Arizona
Phoenix Rising FC
USL Championship stadiums
Buildings and structures in Chandler, Arizona
2021 establishments in Arizona
Gila River Indian Community